My Friend the Thief is a 1951 West German comedy film directed by Helmut Weiss and starring Hans Söhnker, Vera Molnar and Hardy Krüger. It was shot at the Göttingen Studios. The film's sets were designed by the art director Walter Haag.

Cast
 Hans Söhnker as Percy
 Vera Molnar as Nina
 Hardy Krüger as Bimbo
 Olga Tschechowa as Percys Schwester
 Theodor Danegger as Franz
 Käthe Haack as Angela
 Marianne Koch as Resl
 Edgar Ludovici
 Friedel Mumme
 Heini Müller
 Waus
 Benno Sterzenbach
 Charles Wirts

References

Bibliography
 Bock, Hans-Michael & Bergfelder, Tim. The Concise Cinegraph: Encyclopaedia of German Cinema. Berghahn Books, 2009.

External links 
 

1951 films
1951 comedy films
German comedy films
West German films
1950s German-language films
Films directed by Helmut Weiss
Constantin Film films
German black-and-white films
1950s German films
Films shot at Göttingen Studios